"Rubber Biscuit" is a novelty doo-wop song performed by the vocals-only team the Chips, who recorded it in 1956. It was covered by the Blues Brothers on their 1978 debut album, Briefcase Full of Blues, among many other artists, as well as being featured in the 1973 film Mean Streets.

Songwriting
"Rubber Biscuit" started life as Kinrod Johnson's answer to the marching rhythms of the Warwick School For Delinquent Teenagers while he was an intern there. Label credit for writing and composing the song was given to Chips lead singer Charles Johnson and Adam R. Levy. But Levy's father, label owner Morris Levy, was notorious for adding either his or his son's names to songwriting credits in order to claim partial, or in some cases full, author-composer royalties on songs they did not write. There is no evidence that Morris Levy or Adam Levy ever wrote any songs.

Lyrics
Few of the lyrics can actually be understood, as they are sung in the scat manner. The scat is interrupted every few bars for short one-liners, most of which are implicit references to the singer's poverty and meager diet resulting from such: a "wish sandwich" (where one has two slices of bread and wishes for meat in between them), a "ricochet biscuit" (which is supposed to bounce off the wall and into one's mouth, and when it does not, "you go hungry"), a "cold-water sandwich" (or a "cool-water sandwich") which refers to consuming watermelon, and a "Sunday-go-to-meeting-bun," which is a reference to taking a little lady to church, as Blues Brother Elwood explains in a live version of the performance. The song closes with the question "What do you want for nothing — a rubber biscuit?"

Personnel
The Chips were teenage friends in New York: Charles Johnson (lead vocal), Nathaniel Epps (baritone), Paul Fulton (bass), Sammy Strain and Shedrick Lincoln (tenors).

Recorded August 3, 1956, at Belltone Studios, New York City.
Ernie Hayes - piano
Panama Francis - drums 
Mickey Baker - guitar
King Curtis - saxophone
 other musicians unidentified

Performance and aftermath
When Josie Records heard the tune they signed the group and the record was issued in September 1956. Although it did not chart, "Rubber Biscuit" became popular on the East Coast, allowing the Chips to tour alongside the Dells, the Cadillacs, and Bo Diddley, but the momentum gained by their debut single was waning and the group broke up at the end of 1957. Only Sammy Strain went on to success in the music industry, as a member of Little Anthony & the Imperials from about 1961 to 1972, when he left to join the O'Jays. Strain left the O'Jays in 1992 to return to the Imperials, where he remained 
until his retirement in 2004.

Blues Brothers cover
In 1978, The Blues Brothers recorded a cover of "Rubber Biscuit" on the album Briefcase Full of Blues; this version (with lead vocal by actor-singer Dan Aykroyd) was released as a single that peaked at #37 on the Billboard Hot 100 and #44 in Canada.

In popular culture
 "Rubber Biscuit" was used in the Martin Scorsese 1973 film, Mean Streets.  
 It was also featured in the 1990 John Waters film, Cry-Baby.

References

1956 songs
1978 singles
Comedy songs
Doo-wop songs
The Chips songs
The Blues Brothers songs

pt:Rubber Biscuit